Anime Punch was a Columbus, Ohio-based organization that hosts a number of events for fans of Japanese animation in the Central Ohio area.  It originally began hosting an annual anime convention called Anime Punch, and subsequently branched out into hosting weekly social events, monthly lectures, and other regular events, in addition to three annual anime conventions. The convention ceased operations in September 2017, due to its con chair becoming a registered sex offender.

Armageddicon
The main event of Anime Punch!, Armageddicon focused exclusively on anime, eschewing the recent trend of conventions to attempt to cover anything and everything remotely related to Japan. Notably, Armageddicon also features a high density of educational, cultural and scholarly panels and workshops. During the 2008 convention, Anime Punch! Armageddicon became the first anime convention to adopt radio-frequency identification (RFID) in order to collect data about dealers' room entrances and panel attendance.

Event history

Revoluticon
Revoluticon was introduced for a debut in 2012 as a new line of events hosted by Anime Punch!.  Whereas Armageddicon is entirely focused on anime with limited to no non-anime content, Revoluticon was billed as the anti-armageddicon.  It is still aimed at anime fans, but only their tangential interests, with zero anime content.  Covered subject matter includes video games, fantasy, science fiction, western animation, comic books, traditional Japanese culture, Japanese modern/pop culture, and cosplay.

Event History

Fieldcon
Fieldcon is another line of conventions that since 2006 has been hosted by Anime Punch! It takes place entirely outdoors without access to electricity, running water, or the internet. Its remote location in the AEP ReCreation Lands near The Wilds takes it far from most people, and even cellphone reception.  Attendance is small, and events are informal.

Event history

References

External links
 

Ohio State University
Defunct anime conventions
Culture of Columbus, Ohio
Conventions in Ohio